The Violin Concerto No. 2 in C major, Op. 58, by Camille Saint-Saëns, was the composer's first violin concerto, written in 1858, although it was published in 1879 and so is numbered second. It was premiered in 1880 with Pierre Marsick as soloist.

Structure 
The work is in three movements:

Recordings
 Ivry Gitlis, violon, (with concerto n°4, op.62, unfinished), Orchestre National de Mont Carlo, conductor Edouard Van Remoortel. LP Philipps 1968 report CD 1998
Ulf Hoelscher, violin, Complete Violin Concertos (n°1, n°2, n°3), New Philharmonia Orchestra, conductor Pierre Dervaux. Recorded 1977. 2 CD Brillant Classics 2012
Philippe Graffin, violin, Complete Violin Concertos (n°1, n°2, n°3), Scottish Symphony Orchestra, conductor Martyn Brabbins. CD Hyperion 1998
 Fanny Clamagirand, violin, Complete Violin Concertos (n°1, n°2, n°3), Finlandia Jyväskilä, conductor Patrick Gallois. CD Naxos 2009
 Andrew Wan, violin, Complete Violin Concertos (n°1, n°2, n°3), Orchestre symphonique de Montréal, conductor Kent Nagano. CD Analekta 2015

External links

Concertos by Camille Saint-Saëns
Saint-Saens 02
1858 compositions
Compositions in C major